Robert Dozier Davis III (born December 1, 1990), better known as 24hrs, is an American rapper, singer, DJ, and record producer. He is best known for his single "What You Like" (featuring Ty Dolla $ign and Wiz Khalifa) from his mixtape Night Shift (2017). He is the older brother of Atlanta rapper MadeinTYO.

Early life
Davis was born in Oakland, California. He is the older brother to fellow recording artist MadeinTYO, with whom he worked early in his career. In the mid 2000s, they both moved together to Atlanta, Georgia.

Career
24hrs began his artistry under the name Royce Rizzy in 2011.
He released his first mixtape, Bag Muzik under Lil Scrappy's G$UP record label. His first change came about when he signed to Jermaine Dupri's So So Def Recordings record label.

On December 12, 2016, Davis released What You Like featuring American rappers Ty Dolla $ign and Wiz Khalifa. The song became popular in early February 2017 and was sent to contemporary hit radio & rhythmic contemporary on February 27 2017. 

On November 16, 2018, Davis released his debut album, House on the Hill. The album featured executive production by Hit-Boy and Ty Dolla Sign, as well as guest appearances from Lil Pump, YG, Moneybagg Yo, Smokepurpp and Dom Kennedy, among others.

Discography
24hrs (2015)
Open (2016)
12 AM (2016)
Sunset Blvd (2016)
24hrs in Tokyo with MadeinTYO (2016)
Open Late (2017)
Not Open Late (2017)
Night Shift (2017)
12 AM in Atlanta (2017)
3200 Lenox RD (2018)
Houses on the Hill (2018)
B4 XMAS (2018)
 Valentino Twenty (2019)
 World on Fire (2019)
 Dark Dreams Vol. 1 (2020)
 No Judge with Corey Ellis (2020)
 12 AM in Atlanta 2 with DJ Drama (2020)
 Big Dog (2020)
 Big Dog 2.0 (2020)
Real Walker (2021)
Real Walker 1.5 (2021)

References

External links

Rappers from Atlanta
Rappers from Oakland, California
People from Oakland, California
Living people
1990 births
21st-century American rappers
African-American DJs
African-American male rappers
21st-century African-American male singers
African-American record producers
American hip hop record producers
Trap musicians
American contemporary R&B singers